Tessaracoccus coleopterorum is a Gram-positive, coccus-shaped, facultatively anaerobic and non-motile bacterium from the genus Tessaracoccus which has been isolated from the intestine of a dark diving beetle.

References 

Propionibacteriales
Bacteria described in 2021